Flying saucers are small spheroidal capsules of sherbet-filled rice paper.

History 
The first flying saucers were produced in the early 1950s when an Antwerp based producer of communion wafers, Belgica, faced a decline in demand for their product. Astra Sweets now owns the Belgica brand and continue to make the product. Flying saucers are officially registered as a traditional product of Flanders. Their popularity in the United Kingdom from the 1960s to the 1970s was attributed to the Space Race and increased interest in science fiction.

They remain a popular sweet in Belgium and the United Kingdom. Flying saucers came 12th in a 2009 poll among adults for 'Britain's top sweets' and experienced a resurgence in popularity, along with other traditional sweets, in the 2010s. They have also been featured on lists of vegan sweets for Halloween. They were also a popular sweet in Ireland.

References

British confectionery
Candy